SAETA Air Ecuador (legally Sociedad Anónima Ecuatoriana de Transportes Aéreos S.A.) was a privately held airline of Ecuador, which was founded in 1966. During its heyday in the 1990s, it flew to numerous destinations in North and South America from its base in Guayaquil.

History

SAETA was founded in Quito in 1966, later the company headquarters were relocated to Guayaquil. The main owners were the Dunn family.

In addition to domestic flights, SAETA operated routes in North, Central and South America. It preferred flights to Los Angeles, New York City, Miami, Panamá, Caracas, Bogotá, Lima, Santiago and Buenos Aires.

In 1990, SAETA took over the Ecuadorian airline SAN, increasing frequencies and fleet for national and international flights. The airline later in 1994 took over LAPSA from Paraguay, operated with an Ecuadorian-Paraguayan Consortium until being sold to TAM Linhas Aereas in 1996. Political instability in the country and currency devaluation led to a decline in passenger numbers. This was followed by the cancellation of flights to the United States of America due to the loss of the approach permit for Category 1 airports.

By the mid-1990s, events such as political instability and the devaluation of the currency, damaged SAETA, which caused a reduction in passengers, added to the cancellation of flights to the United States due to the loss of category 1 of the Ecuadorian aeronautical authority since 1993, accelerating its decline. Both SAN and SAETA had serious security breaches, which resulted in the loss of several flights.

In February 2000, SAETA ended its flight operations after severe financial problems following the 1998–1999 Ecuador economic crisis.

Destinations

Buenos Aires (Ministro Pistarini International Airport)

Cochabamba (Jorge Wilstermann International Airport)
Santa Cruz de la Sierra (Viru Viru International Airport)

Río de Janeiro (Rio de Janeiro/Galeão International Airport)

Santiago (Comodoro Arturo Merino Benítez International Airport)

Bogota (El Dorado International Airport)

Santo Domingo (Las Americas International Airport)

Cuenca (Mariscal Lamar International Airport)
Guayaquil (José Joaquín de Olmedo International Airport) Hub
Quito (Old Mariscal Sucre International Airport) Hub
San Cristóbal Island (San Cristóbal Airport)

Panama City (Tocumen International Airport)

Lima (Jorge Chávez International Airport)

Los Angeles (Los Angeles International Airport)
Miami (Miami International Airport)
New York City (John F. Kennedy International Airport)

Caracas (Simón Bolívar International Airport)

Fleet

SAETA had operated the following aircraft since it commenced operations:

Accidents and incidents
On July 3, 1969, a Douglas C-47 was hijacked on a domestic flight from Tulcán Airport to Mariscal Sucre International Airport. The hijackers demanded to be taken to Cuba.
On October 20, 1971, a Vickers Viscount was hijacked by six people. It landed at Mariscal Lamar International Airport.
On August 15, 1976, SAETA Flight 232, a Vickers Viscount (registered HC-ARS) crashed into the Chimborazo volcano, killing all 59 people on board. The flight was considered missing until February 2003, after an independent verification of aircraft wreckage that was discovered in October 2002.
On April 23, 1979, a Vickers Viscount (registered HC-AVP) crashed in the Pastaza Province on a flight between the Quito and Cuenca, killing all 57 people on board. The flight was considered missing until 1984, when the wreckage was discovered.
On January 18, 1986, a Sud Aviation Caravelle (registered HC-BAE), operated by Aerovías, crashed in a jungle area after executing a second missed approach procedure at Flores International Airport. Low lying clouds in the area forced the crew to carry out the missed approaches. All 88 passengers and 6 crew members died in the accident.
On August 22, 1997, a Boeing 727-200 (registered HC-BVU) landed at San Cristóbal Airport with its undercarriage strucked the raised lip of the runway, causing it to collapse. After sliding for about 700 m before coming to rest on the right side of the runway.

See also
List of defunct airlines of Ecuador

References

External links

SAETA aircraft

SAETA
Defunct airlines of Ecuador
Airlines established in 1966
Airlines disestablished in 2000
1960 establishments in Ecuador
2000s disestablishments in Ecuador